32 dicembre (32 December) is a 1988 Italian comedy film written and directed by Luciano De Crescenzo. It is loosely based on the De Crescenzo's novel Oi Dialogoi.

For his performance Enzo Cannavale won the Nastro d'Argento for best supporting actor.

Cast 
Luciano De Crescenzo: Psichiatra/ confessore/ astronomo 
Caterina Boratto: Carlotta
Renato Scarpa: Oscar 
Massimo Serato: Ferruccio Ceravolo
Enzo Cannavale: Alfonso Caputo
: brother of Alfonso 
Silvio Ceccato: Cavaliere Ercole Sanfilippo/Socrate
: Salvatore Coppola/Antistene
Sergio Solli: Saverio Pezzullo/Aristippo
: Marlon Cacace/Diogene  
: Caterina/Mirto  
Riccardo Cucciolla: General Emanuele Anselmi
: Antonietta Bisogno
: Adelina Bisogno
Vanessa Gravina: Mimma 
Antonio Allocca: merciaio
: Peppe o' criminale 
Riccardo Pazzaglia: cliente del bar

See also
List of Italian films of 1988

References

External links

1988 films
1988 comedy films
Italian comedy films
1980s Italian-language films
Films directed by Luciano De Crescenzo
Italian anthology films
1980s Italian films